Panasas is a data storage company that creates network-attached storage for technical computing environments.

History 
Panasas is a computer data storage product company and is headquartered in San Jose, California. Panasas received seed funding from Mohr Davidow Ventures (MDV) and others. The first Panasas products were shipped in 2004, the same year that Victor M. Perez became CEO. Faye Pairman became CEO in 2011. Tom Shea, formerly Panasas COO, was appointed as CEO in 2020.

Technology 
Panasas developed an extension for managing parallel file access in the Network File System, which was later integrated in Parallel NFS (pNFS), part of the NFS version 4.1 specification, published by the Internet Engineering Task Force as RFC 5661 in January 2010. pNFS described a way for the NFS protocol to process file requests to multiple servers or storage devices at once, instead of handling the requests serially.

Panasas supports DirectFlow, NFS, Parallel NFS and Server Message Block (also known as CIFS) data access protocols to integrate into existing local area networks. Panasas blade servers manage metadata, serving data for DirectFlow, NFS and CIFS clients using 10 Gigabit Ethernet. Panasas systems provide data storage and management for high-performance applications in the biosciences, energy, media and entertainment, manufacturing, government and research sectors.

ActiveStor 
The ActiveStor product line is a parallel file system appliance that integrates hybrid storage hardware (hard drives and solid state drives), the PanFS parallel file system, its proprietary DirectFlow data access protocol, and the industry standard NFS and CIFS network protocols.

ActiveStor Ultra 
ActiveStor Ultra (introduced in November 2018) is the newest generation of the Panasas ActiveStor storage system and features a re-engineered, portable file system that delivers performance and reliability on suitably qualified, industry standard storage hardware platforms.

ActiveStor 20 (now ActiveStor Classic) was announced in August 2016 with increased capacity, using larger and faster disks. In November 2017, Panasas released the ActiveStor Director 100 and the ActiveStor Hybrid 100 (now ActiveStor Prime), which disaggregated the Director Blade, the controller node of Panasas storage system, from the storage nodes. In November 2018, Panasas introduced ActiveStor Ultra, which featured a completely re-engineered portable file system (PanFS® 8) running on industry standard hardware.

DirectFlow 
DirectFlow is a parallel data access protocol designed by Panasas for ActiveStor. DirectFlow avoids protocol I/O bottlenecks by accessing Panasas storage directly and in parallel. DirectFlow was originally supported on Linux, and expanded in April 2016 to support Apple's MacOS.

PanFS 
Panasas created the PanFS clustered file system as single pool of storage under a global filename space to support multiple applications and workflows in a single storage system. PanFS supports DirectFlow (pNFS), NFS and CIFS data access protocols simultaneously. PanFS 7.0 added a FreeBSD operating foundation and a GUI that supports asynchronous push notification of system changes without user interaction.

In August 2020, Panasas announced a new version of PanFS that features Dynamic Data Acceleration technology, which automatically tunes storage for small files and mixed workloads. While other storage systems assign data to media "tiers" based on how recently files were accessed, Dynamic Data Acceleration assigns data based on file size to most efficiently use the underlying media. The "novel" method is designed to improve performance, eliminate manual tuning and control storage costs.

References

External links 
 Panasas Company web site
 Parallel NFS

Computer storage companies
Computer companies of the United States
Computer companies established in 1999
Technology companies based in the San Francisco Bay Area
Privately held companies based in California
Companies based in Sunnyvale, California
Network file systems
American companies established in 1999